Kazachinsky District is an administrative and municipal district (raion), one of the forty-three in Krasnoyarsk Krai, Russia. It is located in the southern central part of the krai and borders with Yeniseysky and Motyginsky Districts in the north, Taseyevsky District in the east, Bolshemurtinsky District in the south, and with Pirovsky District in the west. Its administrative center is the rural locality (a selo) of Kazachinskoye. Population:  The population of Kazachinskoye accounts for 33.8% of the district's total population.

Geography
The district is located in the Central part of Krasnoyarsk region, 160-230 km North of Krasnoyarsk And 110-130 km from Yeniseisk. The area is 5755 km².

Situated on both banks of the Yenisey river, through the area the trail passes Р409 "Krasnoyarsk — Yeniseisk". Near the village of kazachinsky (233-240 km from Krasnoyarsk) is one of the most impassable areas on the Yenisei — kazachinsky threshold (rus).  Adjacent territory:
 North: Yeniseisky and Motyginsky districts of Krasnoyarsk region;
 East: Taseevsky district of Krasnoyarsk territory;
 South: Bolshemurtinsky district of Krasnoyarsk region;
 West: Pirovsky district of Krasnoyarsk region.

History
The district was founded on April 4, 1924.

Divisions and government
Kazachinsky district Council of deputies
Date of formation: 13.09.2015. Term of office: 5 years

Chairman
Paskolniy Igor Nikolaevich
Head of kazachinsky district
Ozerskyh Yury Evgenievich. Date of election: 27.07.2015. Term of office: 5 years

References

Notes

Sources

Districts of Krasnoyarsk Krai
States and territories established in 1924